"The Miracle (of Joey Ramone)" is a song by Irish rock band U2. It is the opening track from their thirteenth studio album, Songs of Innocence, and was released as its lead single. It was produced by Danger Mouse, Paul Epworth, and Ryan Tedder. It was first unveiled by the band during their performance at an Apple Inc. product launch event on 9 September 2014, coinciding with an announcement that Songs of Innocence would be released digitally to iTunes Store customers free of charge. The song's title refers to American musician Joey Ramone, lead singer of influential punk rock band the Ramones.

Writing and recording
"The Miracle (of Joey Ramone)" originated from U2's recording sessions with Danger Mouse in 2010, initially consisting of a drum loop and acoustic guitar. With the input of producers Ryan Tedder and Paul Epworth, it evolved into a rockier song called "Siren", with one lyric comparing the music of the punk rock band Ramones to a siren song. The band settled on the final melody and lyrics with Epworth during the final two months of the album's recording sessions.

The song pays tribute to Joey Ramone, the lead singer of Ramones, who had a strong influence on Bono. During their teenage years, U2 snuck into a Ramones concert, and the experience of watching Joey perform made Bono feel less self-conscious about his own singing.

Release

In the days leading to an Apple Inc. product launch event on 9 September 2014 in Cupertino, California, reports began to circulate that U2 would be involved, which were promptly denied by a spokesperson for the band. Nonetheless, towards the end of the event U2 appeared and performed a new song titled "The Miracle (of Joey Ramone)", the lead single from their thirteenth studio album Songs of Innocence, with Apple CEO Tim Cook announcing that the album would be released digitally in its entirety at no cost to all iTunes Store customers. The presentation concluded with the unveiling of an Apple advertisement featuring U2 performing the song.

"The Miracle (of Joey Ramone)" was subsequently released to United States adult album alternative (triple A) radio stations on 15 September 2014 and modern rock stations on 16 September. Ahead of its official radio release, it had already been added to the playlists of several stations and subsequently debuted at numbers 19 and 38 on the Billboard Adult Alternative Songs and Rock Airplay charts, respectively.

Former Ramones drummer Marky Ramone praised the song but was perplexed that U2 did not mention Joey Ramone's name anywhere in the lyrics. Regardless, he added that Joey would be very grateful for the tribute.

Music video
The official music video for the song was launched on 14 October 2014, first in the iTunes store and later on the band's official website.

Charts

Weekly charts

Year-end charts

Certifications

References

2014 singles
2014 songs
Island Records singles
Songs written by Adam Clayton
Songs written by Bono
Songs written by the Edge
Songs written by Larry Mullen Jr.
Song recordings produced by Danger Mouse (musician)
Song recordings produced by Paul Epworth
Song recordings produced by Ryan Tedder
U2 songs
Music videos directed by Mark Romanek